USS PCE-893 was a  for the United States Navy during World War II. She was renamed Siboney (H 101) after being acquired by the Cuban Navy on 20 November 1947.

History
PCE-893 was laid down by Willamette Iron and Steel Works, Portland on 27 October 1942 and launched on 8 May 1943. She was commissioned on 25 July 1944 and assigned to the west coast.

In September 1945, she was assigned to the Philippine Sea Frontier for monitoring weather and planes.

From mid-1947, she was homeported in New Orleans.

After the war, she was transferred to the Foreign Liquidation Commission and later sold to Cuba and renamed Siboney (H 101) in the early 1950s. She was reclassified to (PE 202).

References

1943 ships
PCE-842-class patrol craft